Belleville Township High School West (also known as Belleville West) is a public comprehensive high school in Belleville, Illinois that is part of Belleville Township High School District 201.

Athletics

The Maroons, as West teams are known, compete in the Southwestern Conference
The sports at West are divided into three separate seasons - held respectively during the Fall, Winter and Spring.  Each season has its own individual and team sports which begin with a try-out session and an introductory night of activities and ends with an awards ceremony.  A season lasts for approximately 3 months.  The sports within a season are organized by teams, usually based on age and athletic ability, with the varsity designation as the highest level.  Athletics at Belleville West are governed by the by-laws of the Illinois High School Association.

State titles 
Baseball:1940, 1947, 1949, 1954
Boys' Basketball: 2018, 2019
Boys' Golf: 1968, 1970, 1972
Girls' Track and Field: 2009
Girls' Volleyball:  1991, 1992

History

Originally, the Belleville Township High School District 201 operated only one school, Belleville Township High School, located at 2600 West Main Street. The growth of the district, however, prompted the Board of Education to construct a new campus and divide the student body between two schools. Thus, Belleville East High School was constructed, opening in the fall of 1966. The new campus was built in a college format with many different buildings. The newly commissioned Belleville Area College (now Southwestern Illinois College) occupied half of the campus while the new high school occupied the other. However, enrollment in the school increased rapidly and the college was forced to move to a new location. As the growth of the District continued, the need for a larger Belleville West Campus was realized. Therefore, in 2003, a new state of the art high school was built on 113 acres at the corner of Rt 15 and Frank Scott Parkway West.

Activities

Fine and performing arts
Little Theatre is an organization that promotes theatrical events on the Belleville West campus.  The group sponsors monthly informational meetings, social events, and a spring honors reception.  The theater always puts on a total of five plays per year. These include a fall play, a children's play, a musical, and contest play in the second semester. There is an evening of one-acts every year as well for freshmen and sophomores.

Hy News

The Belleville West Hy News has been reporting the news of Belleville Township High School and then Belleville West High School for over 80 years. This student publication is a co-curricular activity, produced by its 38-member staff, which includes freshmen through seniors.

Notable alumni
 Jenny Bindon, professional soccer player, goalkeeper for New Zealand during the 2008 Olympics and 2012 Olympics
 Brian Daubach, former MLB player (Florida Marlins, Boston Red Sox, Chicago White Sox, New York Mets)
 Lea DeLaria, actor, comedian, jazz musician and singer
 Neal Doughty, musician, member of REO Speedwagon 
 Jay Farrar, musician, member of Uncle Tupelo and Son Volt
 Bob Goalby, professional golfer, winner of the 1968 Masters Tournament
 Jay Haas, professional golfer, NCAA golf champion at Wake Forest University
 Brian Hill, professional football player, currently with the San Francisco 49ers
 E. J. Liddell, Two-time Illinois Mr. Basketball, former player for Ohio State Buckeyes men's basketball, current professional basketball player for New Orleans Pelicans
 Rusty Lisch, NFL quarterback 
 Sandra Magnus, NASA astronaut
 Les Mueller, former MLB player (Detroit Tigers)
 David Rasche, actor
 Seth Rudolph, professional soccer player
 Austin Seibert, kicker for the Detroit Lions, former Oklahoma Sooner, set record for most points all time by a kicker in FBS history
 Jeff Tweedy, musician, member of Uncle Tupelo and Wilco
 Bud Zipfel, former MLB player (Washington Senators)

References

Public high schools in Illinois
Belleville, Illinois
Schools in St. Clair County, Illinois
Educational institutions established in 1916
1916 establishments in Illinois